Theodora of Wallachia was the daughter of Basarab I of Wallachia (r. 1310–1352) and Lady Margareta. She  married Ivan Alexander of Bulgaria as his first wife. This marriage produced four children — Michael Asen, Ivan Sratsimir, Ivan Asen and Vasilisa. In 1345 Tsar Ivan Alexander divorced Tsaritsa Theodora and sent her into a monastery as a nun under the name Teofana.

She is considered the first known nun in Romanian history and in 2022 she was canonized by the Romanian Orthodox Church under the name of Venerable Theopahno Basarab. Her feast day was chosen to be 28 October.

References

Bulgarian consorts
14th-century births
14th-century deaths
14th-century Bulgarian women
14th-century Romanian women
House of Basarab
Year of birth missing
Year of death missing
People of medieval Wallachia
Women of medieval Wallachia